In the Chicago mayoral election of 1903, Democrat Carter Harrison Jr. was reelected to a fourth term, defeating Republican candidate Graeme Stewart.	

The election took place on April 7. Before the election, both Harrison and Stewart had received their party's nominations by acclamation at each party's municipal nominating convention.

Background
1903 was shaping up to be a challenging reelection for incumbent Democrat Carter Harrison Jr.

By 1903, the municipal reform movement in Chicago, which had been on the rise since the 1890s, had become a strong force in Chicago politics.

By 1903, an anti-Harrison coalition had begun to arise in Chicago, consisting of members of union ( including in the Chicago Federation of Labor), former Harrison ally Robert "Bobby" Burke's followers, and remnants of what had been the once-strong Altgeld wing of the Democratic party.

In 1903, the traction issue was a popular concern, particularly the issue of municipal ownership of streetcars.

Nominations

Democratic
Incumbent mayor Carter Harrison Jr. was renominated by the Democratic Party. Few others seemed interested in seeking the nomination.

While there had been factional disputes within the party, most of the Democratic Party united behind Harrison as a nominee. A key exception to this was Harrison's once-ally Robert "Bobby" Burke, who remained opposed to Harrison.

Harrison easily won the primaries to select delegates for the city's nominating convention, with his supporters being heavily selected as delegates. A pro-Harrison delegate nominee even beat former Cook County Democratic Party Chairman Thomas Gahan, who had been seeking to run as a delegate aligned with then-Harrison rival Robert "Bobby" Burke.

Without an opponent, Harrison was renominated at the convention by acclamation. The convention, however, was noted as having been a rather unenthusiastic affair, appearing to signal more tepid or reluctant support of Harrison by his party.

Republican
Businessman Greame Stewart won the Republican nomination. He had previously served as a member of the Executive Committee of the 1900 Republican National Convention. From 1882 through 1890 he was a member of the Chicago Board of Education, serving as the board's president from 1889 through 1890.

With an exceptional reputation for honesty and public service, Stewart had long been considered a potential candidate for mayor of Chicago.

In February, Stewart won the a 2-1 margin of victory in the Republican primaries over his most significant opponent, John Maynard Harlan.

At the Republican convention, Stewart was nominated by acclamation.

United Labor
The United Labor Party first nominated Clarence Darrow, who declined. The party subsequently nominated Daniel L. Cruise.

Beginning at the start of 1903, there was a strong push among members of the Chicago Federation of Labor and others to draft Darrow as an independent candidate for mayor. After an active and organized effort to draft him, which even included a nominating convention-style pro-Darrow mass meeting held at the Auditorium Theatre on February 16, and active consideration of a prospective run on his part, it appeared in late February that Darrow might be preparing to enter the race. However, on February 24, he made the surprise announcement that he would not be running.

The United Labor Party, which had been formed in hopes of nominating Darrow, and had offered him their nomination, moved on after Darrow declined and nominated Daniel L. Cruise.

Prohibition
The Prohibition Party nominated Thomas L. Haines.

Socialist
The Socialist Party nominated Charles L. Breckon.

Socialist Labor
The Socialist Labor Party nominated Henry Sale.

General election
Both major parties were unified behind their candidates.

The major party candidates not both only resided in the city's twenty-first ward, but each also resided in the exact same voting precinct. 

The traction issue became the primary issue of the election. Both candidates supported ultimately supported ultimately having municipal ownership for the streetcar services. Stewart advocated making immediate improvements to its conditions by accepting the best terms the streetcar companies were willing to offer. Harrison advocated holding off on an agreement until the city received the terms it desired.

Harrison worked to paint Stewart as a puppet of corporations and special interests, particularly the streetcar companies.

Republicans worked to paint Harrison as an enabler of corruption. They also worked to paint him as having made few substantive accomplishments in his tenure as mayor, and utilized the slogan "six years, nothing doing" against Harrison.

Stewart's own platform promised reform. In an attempt to make it appear that he was not a product of the political machine, Stewart attempted to convince the electorate that businessmen and not politicians had been the one's who had urged him to run.

Late into the race, Clarence Darrow came forward as a campaign surrogate in support of Harrison, swaying a lot of labor voters in Harrison's favor.

Results
The result was considered to be a close one.

While they lost the mayoralty, in the coinciding elections, Republicans were able to win the races for City Attorney and City Clerk (having won the latter race by a mere several hundred vote margin).

In the coinciding Chicago City Council election, Republicans won a weakened majority. The City Council went from having 39 Republicans, 30 Democrats, and one independent before the 1903 election, to having 35 Republicans, 33 Democrats, and one independent afterwards.

Democrat Ernest Hummel also won the coinciding election for City Treasurer.

Stewart had overwhelmingly won the vote in first precinct of the twenty-first ward, where both he and Harrison resided. Harrison had won this precinct in the previous election. 

Harrison received 64.38% of the Polish-American vote, while Stewart received 31.51%.

References

Mayoral elections in Chicago
Chicago
Chicago
1900s in Chicago